Players and pairs who neither have high enough rankings nor receive wild cards may participate in a qualifying tournament held one week before the annual Wimbledon Tennis Championships.

The qualifying rounds for the 1997 Wimbledon Championships were played from 17 to 22 June 1997 at the Bank of England Ground in Roehampton, London, United Kingdom.

Seeds

  Valda Lake /  Louise Pleming (qualified)
  Svetlana Krivencheva /  Ludmila Richterová (first round)
  Yuko Hosoki /  Keiko Nagatomi (first round)
  Rebecca Jensen /  Lindsay Lee (first round)

Qualifiers

  Valda Lake /  Louise Pleming
  Elena Brioukhovets /  Elena Tatarkova

Lucky losers
  Julia Lutrova /  Jane Wood

Qualifying draw

First qualifier

Second qualifier

External links

1997 Wimbledon Championships on WTAtennis.com
1997 Wimbledon Championships – Women's draws and results at the International Tennis Federation

Women's Doubles Qualifying
Wimbledon Championship by year – Women's doubles qualifying
Wimbledon Championships